Adelina Thaçi (born May 31, 1980) is an Albanian-Kosovar singer and vocal teacher.

Biography
Adelina Thaçi was born on May 31, 1980, to Rasim Thaçi (born 13 July 1949) - (March 26, 2021), one of the most popular Kosovar comedians and a to a doctor mother and part-time singer, Shukrie Thaçi (born 10 December 1957). She was born in Prishtina, the capital of the Republic of Kosovo, then part of SFR Yugoslavia. She started working with music after being registered at a musical high school in her hometown. A few years later, in 1998 she released her first album "Liri e jete pa lote". In 2001 she released "Shko" (Go), penned by Alfred Kaçinari, which became an instant hit. Since then, she was very active in the Albanian music industry. In 2002 releases the album Te Pres and in 2003 released the music video "Komsi Komsa" with "Tormatoprodukcija.

She made a big return in September 2013 when she entered Kënga Magjike with "Po u mërzite" (If you're sad). She dedicated the song to young people with special needs.

Personal life
In 2011 she married Bardhyl Meta, and gave birth to a baby girl named Fiona in January 2012. She temporarily withdrew from music to spend more time with her daughter.

Discography

Albums
2002: Te Pres

Singles
2003: "Comsi-Comsa"
2013: "Po u mërzite"

References

Living people
21st-century Albanian women singers
Kosovan singers
Musicians from Pristina
1980 births
Kosovo Albanians